Healeyfield is a village and civil parish in County Durham, England. The population of the civil parish taken from the 2011 census was 1,544. It is situated to the south west of Consett.

First documented in the Boldon Book as Heleie, “Alain de Chilton, holds Heley, as is contained in his charter, for Cornforth...”. The village is also listed in Bishops Hatfield's survey (1381) as Heley, "...being held by John de Chilton". The place name probably means “the high clearing”.

Healeyfield and the surrounding area had three lead mines. Healeyfield mine, Silvertongue mine and Dean Howl mine. All disused by the 1920s. There was a smelting mill at nearby Watergate, Castleside. 

The village was the site of a prisoner of war camp during the First World War from which two prisoners escaped.

References

External links

Villages in County Durham